Wari Sallani (Aymara wari vicuña, salla rocks, cliffs, -ni a suffix, "cliffs with vicuñas", also spelled Huarisallani) is a  mountain in the Andes of Peru. It is located in the Cusco Region, Canchis Province, on the border of the districts of Checacupe and San Pablo. Wari Sallana lies near the Chhuyumayu valley, southeast of Jach'a Sirk'i.

References

Mountains of Peru
Mountains of Cusco Region